The 1984 Black & Decker Indoor Championships, also known as the Melbourne Indoor Championships,  was an Association of Tennis Professionals men's tournament played on indoor carpet courts at the Festival Hall in Melbourne, Victoria, Australia. It was the fourth edition of the tournament, which was part of the  1984 Grand Prix tennis circuit, and was held from 14 October until 20 October 1984. Unseeded Matt Mitchell won the singles title.

Finals

Singles
 Matt Mitchell defeated  Pat Cash 6–4, 3–6, 6–2
 It was Mitchell's only singles title of his career.

Doubles
 Broderick Dyke /  Wally Masur defeated  Peter Johnston /  John McCurdy 6–2, 6–3

References

External links
 ITF tournament edition details

Black & Decker Indoor Championships
Black & Decker Indoor Championships, 1984
Sports competitions in Melbourne
Tennis in Victoria (Australia)
Black & Decker Indoor Championships
Black & Decker Indoor Championships